The Secretary of State of His Holiness (Latin: Secretarius Status Sanctitatis Suae,
), commonly known as the Cardinal Secretary of State, presides over the Holy See's Secretariat of State, which is the oldest and most important dicastery of the Roman Curia. The Secretariat of State performs all the political and diplomatic functions of the Holy See and the Vatican City. The Secretary of State is sometimes described as the prime minister of the Holy See, even though the nominal head of government of Vatican City is the President of the Pontifical Commission for Vatican City State.

The Secretary of State is currently Cardinal Pietro Parolin.

Duties
The Cardinal Secretary is appointed by the Pope, and serves as one of his principal advisors.  As one of the senior offices in the Roman Catholic Church, the secretary is required to be a cardinal.  If the office is vacant, a non-cardinal may serve as pro-tem secretary of state, exercising the powers of the Secretary of State until a suitable replacement is found or the Pro-Secretary is made a cardinal in a subsequent consistory.

The Cardinal Secretary's term ends when the Pope who appointed him dies or leaves office. During the sede vacante period, the former secretary acts as a member of a commission with the Camerlengo of the Holy Roman Church and the former President of the Pontifical Commission for Vatican City State, which exercises some of the functions of the head of state of the Vatican City until a new Pope is elected. Once the new Pope is chosen, the former secretary's role in the commission likewise expires, though he can be re-appointed as Secretary of State.

History

The office traces its origins to that of secretarius intimus, created by Pope Leo X in the early 16th century to handle correspondence with the diplomatic missions of the Holy See, which were just beginning to become permanent postings instead of missions sent on particular occasions. At this stage the secretary was a fairly minor functionary, the Vatican administration being led by the Cardinal Nephew, the Pope's confidant usually taken from his family.

The imprudence of Pope Julius III in entrusting the office of Cardinal Nephew to his alleged lover Innocenzo Ciocchi Del Monte, a teenaged, virtually illiterate street urchin whom his brother had adopted a few years earlier, led to an upgrading of the Secretary's job, as the incumbent had to take over the duties the Cardinal Nephew was unfit for. By the time of Pope Innocent X the Secretary of State was always himself a Cardinal, and Pope Innocent XII abolished the office of Cardinal Nephew in 1692. From then onwards the Secretary of State has been the most important of the officials of the Holy See.

In 1968, Pope Paul VI's apostolic constitution Regimini Ecclesiae Universae further enhanced the powers of the Secretary, placing him over all the other departments of the Roman Curia. In 1973 Paul further broadened the Secretaryship by abolishing the ancient office of Chancellor of the Holy Roman Church and merging its functions into those of the Secretary.

List

Secretaries of State between 1551 and 1644
Girolamo Dandini (1551–1555)
Carlo Borromeo (1560–1565)
Tolomeo Gallio (1565–1566)
Girolamo Rusticucci (1566–1572)
Tolomeo Gallio (again) (1572–1585)
Decio Azzolini (seniore) (1585–1587)
Alessandro Peretti di Montalto (Cardinal-Nephew) (1587–1590)
Paolo Emilio Sfondrati (Cardinal-Nephew) (1591)
Giovanni Antonio Facchinetti de Nuce (Cardinal-Nephew) (1591)
Pierbenedetto Peretti (1592–1593)
Pietro Aldobrandini (Cardinal-Nephew) and Cinzio Passeri Aldobrandini (Cardinal-Nephew) (1593–1605)
Roberto Ubaldini (1605)
Erminio Valenti (1605)
Lanfranco Margotti (1605–1611)
Porifrio Feliciani (1611–1621)
Giovanni Battista Agucchi (1621–1623)
Lorenzo Magalotti (1623–1628)
Lorenzo Azzolini (1628–1632)
Pietro Benessa (1632–1634)
Francesco Adriano Ceva (1634–1643)
Giovanni Battista Spada (1643–1644)

Cardinal Secretaries of State since 1644

Giovanni Giacomo Panciroli (1644–1651)
Fabio Chigi (1651–1655); then elected Pope Alexander VII (1655–1667)
Giulio Rospigliosi (1655–1667); then elected  Pope Clement IX (1667–1669)
Decio Azzolini (iuniore) (1667–1669)
Federico Borromeo (iuniore) (1670–1673)
Francesco Nerli (iuniore) (1673–1676)
Alderano Cybo (1676–1689)
Giambattista Rubini (1689–1691)
Fabrizio Spada (1691–1700)
Fabrizio Paolucci (1700–1721) (first time)
Giorgio Spinola (1721–1724)
Fabrizio Paolucci (1724–1726) (second time)
Niccolò Maria Lercari (1726–1730)
Antonio Banchieri (1730–1733)
Giuseppe Firrao, Sr. (1733–1740)
Silvio Valenti Gonzaga (1740–1756)
Alberico Archinto (1756–1758)
Ludovico Maria Torriggiani (1758–1769)
Lazzaro Opizio Pallavicini (1769–1785)
Ignazio Boncompagni Ludovisi (1785–1789)
Francesco Saverio de Zelada (1789–1796)
Ignazio Busca (1796–1797)
Giuseppe Doria Pamphili (1797–1799)
Ercole Consalvi, pro-secretary (1800); secretary (1800–1806)
Filippo Casoni (1806–1808)
Giulio Gabrielli the Younger (1808–1814) -Giuseppe Doria Pamphilj, pro-secretary  (1808) -Bartolomeo Pacca, pro-secretary  (1808–1814)
Ercole Consalvi (1814–1823)
Giulio Maria della Somaglia (28 September 1823 – 17 January 1828)
Tommaso Bernetti, pro-secretary  (17 June 1828 – 10 February 1829) (first time)
Giuseppe Albani (31 March 1829 – 30 November 1830)
Tommaso Bernetti, pro-secretary (21 February – 10 August 1831); cardinal secretary (10 August 1831 – 12 January 1836) (second time)
Luigi Lambruschini (12 January 1836 – 1 June 1846)
Tommaso Pasquale Gizzi (8 August 1846 – 5 July 1847)
Gabriele Ferretti (17 July 1847 – 31 December 1848)
Giuseppe Bofondi (1 February – 10 March 1848)
Giacomo Antonelli (10 March – 3 May 1848) (first time)
Anton Orioli (5 May – 4 June 1848), cardinal secretary ad interim
Giovanni Soglia Ceroni (4 June – 29 November 1848)
Giacomo Antonelli (29 November 1848 – 6 November 1876) (second time)
Giovanni Simeoni (18 December 1876 – 7 February 1878)

In popular culture
Silvio Orlando portrayed fictional Cardinal Secretary of State Voiello in the 2016 Sky Italia Sky Atlantic HBO Canal+ co-produced television series The Young Pope and the 2019 follow-up series The New Pope.

See also
Secretary of State
Index of Vatican City-related articles

References

External links
Secretary of State: a Top Collaborator
 

 
1551 establishments in the Papal States